The Imperial Order of the Rose was a Brazilian order of chivalry, instituted by Emperor Pedro I of Brazil on 17 October 1829 to commemorate his marriage to Amélie of Leuchtenberg.

On 22 March 1890, the order was cancelled as national order by the interim government of First Brazilian Republic. Since the deposition in 1889 of the last Brazilian monarch, Emperor Pedro II, the order continues as a house order being awarded by the Heads of the House of Orleans-Braganza, pretenders to the defunct throne of Brazil. The current Brazilian Imperial Family is split into two branches Petrópolis and Vassouras, and as a consequence the Grand Mastership of the Order is disputed between those two branches.

History
It was designed by Jean-Baptiste Debret, who, as discussed by historians, would have been inspired by the motifs of roses that adorned Amélie's dress when landing in Rio de Janeiro, or when marrying, or in a portrait of the same envoy from Europe to the then Emperor of Brazil.

The order rewarded military and civilians, national and foreign, who distinguished themselves by their fidelity to the person of the Emperor and by services rendered to the State, and carried a number of degrees superior to the other Brazilian and Portuguese orders then existing.

From 1829 to 1831 Emperor Pedro I granted only 189 insignia. His son and successor, Emperor Pedro II, during the second reign, got to grace 14,284 citizens. In addition to the two emperors, only the Duke of Caxias was order-great during his term.

One of the first winners received the commendation for services rendered during an accident with the Brazilian imperial family: the small history of the court tells us that on 7 December 1829, newly married, Pedro I returned with the family of the Imperial Palace of São Cristóvão, in Quinta da Boa Vista. Like his favorite, he personally drove the carriage when, on Lavradio Street, the tow line was broken, and the horses became frightened, breaking the reins and driving the vehicle, dragged dangerously. The Emperor fractured the seventh rib of the posterior third and the sixth of the anterior third, had bruises on the forehead and dislocation in the fourth right, losing his senses. He had barely recovered them when he was picked up at the nearest house by the Marquis de Cantagalo, Joao Maria da Gama Freitas Berquó. According to the Bulletin on the Disaster of Her Imperial Majesty published in the Jornal do Commercio, Empress Amélie was the one who demanded the least care: "she did not have any sensible damage except the shock and the fright that such disaster should cause her." The Emperor's eldest daughter, the future Queen Maria II of Portugal, "received great bruising on the right cheek, comprising part of the head on the same side." Auguste de Beauharnais, Prince of Eichstätt, Duke of Leuchtenberg and of Santa Cruz, brother of the empress, "had a luxation in the ulna of the right side with fracture of the same one". Baroness Slorefeder, assistant of the Empress, "gave a very dangerous fall on the head." Several servants of livery, when dominating the animals, were bruised. The doctors of the Imperial Chamber and others, the doctors Azeredo, Bontempo, the Baron of Inhomirim, Vicente Navarro de Andrade, João Fernandes Tavares, Manuel Bernardes, Manuel da Silveira Rodrigues de Sá, Baron of Saúde converged for the house of Cantagalo. Almost restored, Pedro I decorated Cantagalo on 1 January 1830 with the insignia of the dignitary of the Order, and Empress Amélie offered him her portrait, surrounded by bright jewels, and painted by Simplício Rodrigues de Sá.

The members of the Honor Guard who accompanied the then Prince Regent on his trip to the Province of São Paulo 8 years before, witnesses of the "Grito do Ipiranga", landmark of the Independence of Brazil, were also awarded the Imperial Order of the Rose.

After the banishment of the Brazilian Imperial Family, the order was maintained by its members in private, being its grand master the head of the Brazilian Imperial House.

Characteristics

Insignia
Grand cross
Obverse: White star with six pointed tips, joined by garland of roses. To the center, a round medallion with the letters "P" and "A" interlaced, embossed, surrounded by blue-ferret border with the caption "LOVE AND FIDELITY".
Reverse: equal to the obverse, with change in inscription for the date of 2-8-1829, and, in the legend, for "PEDRO AND AMÉLIA".

Tape and band
Light pink with two white edges.

Degrees
The degrees in descending order are:

Grand Cross (styled "Excellency" and limited to 16 recipients);
Grand Dignitary (styled "Senhor" and limited to 16 recipients);
Dignitary (styled "Senhor" and limited to 32 recipients);
Commander (styled "Senhor" and unlimited number of recipients);
Official (styled an honorary Colonel and unlimited number of recipients);
Knight (styled an honorary Captain and unlimited number of recipients);

Gallery

Recipients

  Afonso, Prince Imperial of Brazil
  Alexander, Crown Prince of Yugoslavia
  Grand Duke Alexei Alexandrovich of Russia
  José Ferraz de Almeida Júnior
  Luís Alves de Lima e Silva, Duke of Caxias
  Amélie of Leuchtenberg
  Prince Antônio Gastão of Orléans-Braganza
  Prince August Leopold of Saxe-Coburg and Gotha
  José Luís Mena Barreto
  Henry Walter Bates
  Emil Bauch
  John Bramley-Moore
  James Brunlees
  Ernesto Burzagli
  Louis Buvelot
  Peter Christophersen
  Jules d'Anethan
  Warren De la Rue
  Rudolf von Delbrück
  John Hay Drummond Hay
  Ferdinand II of Portugal
  Antônio Ferreira Viçoso
  Marcos Christino Fioravanti
  Princess Francisca of Brazil
  Annibale de Gasparis
  Gaston, Count of Eu
  Friedrich Heinrich Geffcken
  Antônio Carlos Gomes
  Gaspare Gorresio
  John Pascoe Grenfell
  Heinrich Halfeld
  Joaquim José Inácio, Viscount of Inhaúma
  Isabel, Princess Imperial of Brazil
  William Thomson, 1st Baron Kelvin
  Princess Leopoldina of Brazil
  Prince Ludwig August of Saxe-Coburg and Gotha
  Ferdinand I of Bulgaria
  Luís I of Portugal
  Prince Luiz of Orléans-Braganza
  Joseph Luns
  Machado de Assis
  Gonçalves de Magalhães, Viscount of Araguaia
  Manuel Antônio Farinha
  Princess Maria Amélia of Brazil
  Clements Markham
  Victor Meirelles
  Cândido Mendes de Almeida
  John Miers (botanist)
  Ângelo Moniz da Silva Ferraz, Baron Uruguaiana
  Firmino Monteiro
  Carlos de Morais Camisão
  Robert Stirling Newall
  Alfred Nobel
  Sir Andrew Noble, 1st Baronet
  George O'Kelly
  Joseph O'Kelly
  Olav V of Norway
  Henrique O'Neill, 1st Viscount of Santa Mónica
  Jorge Torlades O'Neill I
  Prince Bertrand of Orléans-Braganza
  Honório Hermeto Carneiro Leão, Marquis of Paraná
  José Paranhos, Viscount of Rio Branco
  Louis Pasteur
 Pedro I of Brazil
  Pedro II of Brazil
  Prince Pedro Augusto of Saxe-Coburg and Gotha
  Pedro Carlos of Orléans-Braganza
  Prince Pedro Gastão of Orléans-Braganza
  Prince Pedro Luiz of Orléans-Braganza
  Manuel de Araújo Porto-Alegre, Baron of Santo Ângelo
  James-Ferdinand de Pury
  Antônio Ricardo dos Santos
  Manuel Silvela y Le Vielleuze
  Lafayette Rodrigues Pereira
  Pedro Luís Pereira de Sousa
  Maximilian von Speidel
  Félix Taunay, Baron of Taunay
  Charles d'Ursel
  Louis van Houtte
  Duarte Pio, Duke of Braganza
  Afonso, Prince of Beira

External links
 Original appointment to the Order of the Rose signed by Emperor Dom Pedro II, 1887 - Arquivo Público do Estado de São Paulo

References

 Poliano, Luís Marques. Heráldica. Ed. GRD. Rio de Janeiro, 1986.
 Poliano, Luís Marques. Ordens honoríficas do Brasil.
 Brazil - The Imperial Order of the Rose 

Rose, Order of the
Awards established in 1829